The New Hampshire State Police is a state police agency within the Department of Safety of the U.S. state of New Hampshire. Police employees of the State Police are ex officio constables and have the primary role of patrolling the state highways, enforcing the laws and regulations of the highway and motor vehicles, providing law enforcement for municipalities with no or part time coverage, and regulations relating to the transportation of hazardous materials. The jurisdiction of the State Police is generally throughout the state of New Hampshire (although see the caveat below with regard to towns of more than 3,000 or any city).

The State Police utilizes an APCO Project-25 Digital Radio System. Some of the State Police dispatch centers provide primary dispatch for some communities in the state.

Jurisdiction
New Hampshire RSA 106-B:15 sets out that troopers have primary jurisdiction on all turnpikes, toll roads, limited access highways, interstate highways and towns without full time police coverage.

A State Police trooper has a more restricted jurisdiction in towns of more than 3,000 or any city.  Within any such place a trooper may only act when:

when enforcing motor vehicle laws or the regulations relative to the transportation of hazardous materials;
when witnessing a crime;
is in pursuit of a law violator or suspected violator;
in search of a person wanted for a crime committed outside its limits;
in search of a witness of such crime;
is faced with public safety exigent circumstances;
when acting as an agent of the director of motor vehicles enforcing rules pertaining to driver licenses, registrations and the inspection of motor vehicles;
when requested to act by an official of another law enforcement agency;
when ordered by the governor.

Troop barracks
Troop A: Epping 
Rockingham County
Strafford County

Troop B: Bedford
Hillsborough County

Troop C: Keene
Cheshire County
Sullivan County

Troop D: Concord
Merrimack County

Troop E: Tamworth
Belknap County
Carroll County

Troop F: Twin Mountain
Coos County
Grafton County

Troop G: Concord (formerly the New Hampshire Highway Patrol)
Statewide
Commercial vehicle/hazmat enforcement
DMV-specific missions relating to inspections, licenses, pupil transportation, registrations, auto dealers, and more
Overlap coverage and provide extra troopers to other Troop Stations as needed

History
On July 9, 1869, Governor Stearns was presented with a handwritten piece of legislation that would eventually lead to the formation of the New Hampshire State Police.

The legislation, entitled "An Act to Create a State Police in Certain Cases," outlined just what would constitute the proposed State Police. During this historical period, the various local law enforcement authorities chose not to promote compliance with the liquor laws. Therefore, one of the primary functions of the proposed legislation was the enforcement of these "anti-drinking" laws by the State Police.

The proposed legislation failed to achieve the needed backing of two-thirds of the male voters in New Hampshire. This setback did not diminish the interest and support of a large portion of the population of New Hampshire to have a State Police. The interest in such an organization was responsible for the formation of a State Police Commission. The "Report of State Police Commission to the Legislature" was presented to the January 1931 session of the legislature.

It formulated a comprehensive justification for the necessity of establishing a "State Police" and noted that "… today, with the development of a network of improved highways and the universal use of the automobile, a problem of law enforcement and criminal apprehension has been created for which the established system of local protection had proved inadequate." The Commission also suggested that the need for criminal investigators become a reality and recommended the creation of a State Detective Bureau. Up to that point in time, most State (and County) criminal investigations were performed by private detective agencies. A final recommendation by the State Police Commission was concerned directly with the establishment of a Bureau of Records and Identification within the Department of State Police. In reference to this, criminal statistics, fingerprint taking and other methods of identification would be undertaken. The Bureau would also maintain records of revolver purchases and revolver permits issued within the State.

Bill No. 254, entitled "An Act Creating a Department of State Police" did not easily pass through the legislative process and found itself subjected to many amendments, readings and voting sessions. Ultimately, on June 29, 1937, the New Hampshire State Police was created and subsequently became a statutory reality as Chapter 134 of the Laws of New Hampshire. According to this statute, the law became effective July 1, 1937. The New Hampshire State Police became the 15th organization of its type in the United States.

During the first year of 1937, the New Hampshire State Police established its headquarters in the State House. At that time, the initial ranks were composed of individuals who had been members of the uniformed branch of the New Hampshire Motor Vehicle Department and criminal investigators then employed through the State Attorney General’s office. The first Superintendent of the Department of State Police was George Colbath, the Sheriff of Coos County.

During 1937 the complement of troopers reached an authorized forty-eight men. These men would serve as the benchmark to what has become a tradition of law enforcement service reaching national acclamation.

Harley Davidson motorcycles and a few Chevrolet sedans were the primary modes of transportation utilized by the early troopers. There were five Troops for uniformed operations, and General Headquarters included administration, criminal identification, traffic, and teletype bureaus.

In 1962, the New Hampshire State Police became a division of the newly developed New Hampshire Department of Safety.

Since its inception, the New Hampshire Division of State Police has experienced constant growth and expansion, absorbing smaller law enforcement groups such as the Gaming Enforcement unit and the State Hospital Security, incorporating the 55 police officers of the Division of Enforcement in 1996. In 2008 the eighty officers of the New Hampshire Highway Patrol of the Division of Motor Vehicles were merged into State Police. This latest merger has swelled the NH State Police to approximately 380 troopers.

On April 8, 2020, Colonel Nathan Noyes was sworn in as director of the New Hampshire State Police, replacing Colonel Christopher Wagner, who retired after three years in the position.  Noyes is the son of NHSP Sergeant James Noyes, who was killed in the line of duty on October 3, 1994.

Vehicles 
Primary patrol (fully marked and slicktop):
2021: Dodge Charger 3.6L V6 AWD
AWD is no longer available with the 5.7L V8 as-of '21
2006 - 2020: Dodge Charger 5.7L V8
2014 - 2020 models are AWD
2006 - 2013 models are RWD
1996 - 2005: Ford Crown Victoria 
1992 - 1995: Chevrolet Caprice 5.7L V8
1991: Ford LTD Crown Victoria 
1989 - 1990: Chevrolet Caprice 
1982 - 1988: Ford LTD Crown Victoria

Secondary patrol and specialty units:
1997 - 2020 Chevrolet Tahoe
Most have been RWD PPV models, with some SSV 4WD models since 2015. These are found as fully marked units with lightbars and also as slicktops.
Used in some of F troop's rural patrol areas
Canine, commercial vehicle enforcement, technical accident reconstruction, explosive ordnance disposal
Chevrolet Caprice wagons
Used for commercial vehicle enforcement (most acquired from the merger with NH DMV Enforcement in 1996 and repainted)
2011 - 2020 Ford Super Duty Crew Cabs
Used in slicktop configuration with caps for commercial vehicle enforcement and black unmarked for EOD
2000 - 2012 Chevrolet Impala
Unmarked examples used by some command staff and investigative units

Slicktops:

Previously assigned to troop commanders/lieutenants and assistant troop commanders/staff sergeants (generally plates "00" through "04" of each troop's number block), but since 2006, these are now much more frequently issued to patrol troopers. 

From 2006 through 2013, slicktop Chargers did not have rear trunklid lettering. The lettering reappeared on slicktops beginning in 2014.

Troop commander vehicles are fully marked slicktop Chargers without pushbars or prisoner partitions. 

Ghost vehicles:

Beginning with 2015's Chargers, some all-black slicktops with dark gray graphics were issued. These did not replace the traditional forest green and military pink marked cruisers, slicktops or unmarked vehicles. 

Motorcycles: 

During the summer months, motorcycles are used for patrols when weather permits. The bikes have the same military pink and forest green color scheme as their four-wheeled counterparts.

Aviation:

The NHSP operates two Bell 407 helicopters.

License plates:

NHSP patrol vehicles have unique "State Police" license plates, with plate numbers corresponding to the troop the vehicle is assigned to. 100 series plates belong to A troop, 200 to B troop, 300 to C troop, 400 to D troop, 500 to E troop, 600 to F troop, 700 to G troop and 800 for probationary troopers, and 900 for spare cruisers and other equipment. Single and double digit plates are assigned to headquarters as command and special assignments. When a trooper completes a probationary year with the division, he or she is issued permanent plates for their patrol vehicle.

See also
 List of law enforcement agencies in New Hampshire
 State police
 Highway patrol

References

External links
Official website

State Police
Government agencies established in 1937
1937 establishments in New Hampshire